Melphina melphis, the peculiar forest swift, is a butterfly in the family Hesperiidae. It is found in Sierra Leone, Ivory Coast, Nigeria, Cameroon, Gabon and possibly Ghana. The habitat consists of forests.

References

Butterflies described in 1893
Erionotini
Butterflies of Africa